The Everton Genealogy Collection was a noncirculating collection of genealogy and local history items that was part of the Logan Library in Logan, Utah. It included approximately 80,000 books, serials, pamphlets, compact discs, microfilms, atlases, maps, and databases. A large portion consisted of unpublished manuscripts that were rare or unique to the collection. The materials in the collection related to every state in the United States and the District of Columbia. While the focus was on the United States, there were resources for other nations as well.

History

The Everton Genealogy Collection was started in 1947 by Walter Everton when he established the Everton Publishing Company. He and his successors in the company gathered items to be included in this collection. Some were donated, but most were added when they were sent to be reviewed in their magazine, The Genealogical Helper. Over the course of nearly sixty years, the collection gradually grew to its present size.

In 2001, the publishing company was purchased by the Family History Network, Inc. and in 2004, then owner Bill Schjelderup, donated the collection to Logan City.  In October 2006 the collection opened to the public in the former Logan Justice building. In early 2008, the collection was closed to the public while city departments shuffled buildings.

Current Status

In 2010, a condensed collection opened to the public within the Logan Library in the space formerly occupied by the Logan Municipal Council. It is no longer identified as the Everton Collection but continues to be a large portion of the items housed in the library's Virginia Hansen Special Collections Room.

Genealogical libraries in the United States
Libraries in Utah
Logan, Utah
1947 establishments in Utah